Your Brother's Wife (German: Deines Bruders Weib) is a 1921 German silent film directed by Franz Eckstein and starring Olaf Storm, Olga Limburg and Margarete Schlegel.

Cast
 Werner Funck
 Olga Limburg
 Auguste Prasch-Grevenberg
 Emil Rameau
 Margarete Schlegel
 Olaf Storm

References

Bibliography
 Friedrich Feld. Fritz Rosenfeld, Filmkritiker. Filmarchiv Austria, 2007.

External links

1921 films
Films of the Weimar Republic
German silent feature films
Films directed by Franz Eckstein
German black-and-white films
Films based on German novels
National Film films
1920s German films